The American School of Las Palmas (ASLP) is an American international school in Las Palmas, Canary Islands, Spain. It serves levels nursery through grade twelve.

References

External links
 The American School of Las Palmas
  The American School of Las Palmas

Las Palmas
Las Palmas
Schools in Las Palmas
International schools in the Canary Islands